Cladolasma ailaoshan, is a species of harvestman belonging to the family Nemastomatidae. It is endemic to China.

Etymology
The specific name ailaoshan is due to type locality of the species, Ailaoshan National Natural Reserve.

Description
Female much larger than male. Total length including hood and posterior tubercles is 2.80. Coloration similar. Entire body strongly sclerotized. Surface is covered with a network of interconnected anvil-shaped tubercles. Arched hood elevated above dorsal surface. Coxae with dense wart-bearing setae found on venter. Fingers of chelicerae short. Penis slender and lanceolate. Ovipositor of female is short and unsegmented.

References

Animals described in 2018
Harvestmen